The 1985 European Karate Championships, the 20th edition, was held  in Oslo, Norway from May 5 to 7, 1985.

Competition

Team

Women's competition

Individual

Team

References

External links
Karate Records - European Championship 1985

1985
International sports competitions hosted by Norway
European Karate Championships
European championships in 1985
International sports competitions in Oslo
1980s in Oslo
Karate competitions in Norway
May 1985 sports events in Europe